The 4th constituency of Morbihan is a French legislative constituency in the Morbihan département. Like the other 576 French constituencies, it elects one MP using the two-round system, with a run-off if no candidate receives over 50% of the vote in the first round.

Geography 
The constituency covers the eastern areas of Morbihan.

Description

At the 2017 election Paul Molac of En Marche! was one of only four candidates elected in the first round.

Historic representation

Election results

2022

 
 
 
 
 
 
 
|-
| colspan="8" bgcolor="#E9E9E9"|
|-

2017

2012

 
 
 
 
 
 
 
|-
| colspan="8" bgcolor="#E9E9E9"|
|-

2007

References

Sources
 Official results of French elections from 1998: 

4